Aled Davies may refer to:

 Aled Wyn Davies (born 1974), Welsh classical tenor
 Aled Davies (field athlete) (born 1991), Paralympic athlete from Wales
 Aled Davies (rugby union) (born 1992), Welsh rugby union player